Denny Tsettos, is an American club/house DJ, producer and remixer. He had mixshows on WKTU and Sirius Satellite Radio Area channel 33.

Discography

Remixography
 "Me and You" - Alexia
 "Number One" - Alexia
 "Until We Meet Again" - Aria
 "Love on Top" - Beyoncé
 "Honey" - Billy Ray Martin
 "Keep Pushin'" - Booom!
 "Turn It Up" - Brandy
 "Afrodisiac" - Brandy
 "Where Ever You Are" - Bryan Todd
 "Let The Love Go On" - Candy Club
 "Angel" - The Corrs
 "I Never Said" - Cynthia
 "Something Happened on the Way to Heaven" - Deborah Cox
 "That Look" - De'Lacy
 "I Can't Wait" - Dianne Wesley
 "I Believe" - Georgie Porgie
 "Angel" - Joée
 "How Can I Be Falling - Jennifer Green
 "Señorita" - Justin Timberlake
 "Jealousy" - Kim Sanders
 "You Won't Forget Me" - La Bouche
 "Here We Go Again" - Layla
 "Don't Go" - Le Click
 "I Still Love You" - Lil Suzy
 "Rejoice" - Michelle Weeks
 "I Want You Back" - 'N SYNC
 "Got To Believe" - Pulse 81
 "Breakin' Dishes" - Rihanna
 "Where Have You Been" - Rihanna
 "Don't Go Lose It Baby" - Rozalla
 "DJ Love Song" - Shyra Sánchez
 "Believe It" - Spencer & Hill
 "Wouldnit" - Yoko Ono

External links
Official Website 

American DJs
American dance musicians
American house musicians
American record producers
Club DJs
Living people
Nightlife in New York City
Remixers
Sirius Satellite Radio
Year of birth missing (living people)
Electronic dance music DJs